Poor Sasha is a 1997 Russian adventure film directed by Tigran Keosayan.

Plot
A touching New Year's fairy tale about those who, despite money and status, lack love and warmth.

Moscow, late 1990s. Beryozkin, an honest, but unlucky bank robber is granted temporarily leave from prison after rescuing a general who's locked himself in a vault. He is given money by the prison warden and one of the mob bosses for gifts, but the money gets stolen by a pickpocket, and Beryozkin realizes that his best option is to commit suicide in order to avoid an otherwise gruesome death. He is saved by a tramp named Aristarchus, who offers him a solution: to rob the home of a banker.

Little do they know that the banker's home is booby-trapped by her twelve-year-old daughter Sasha. The unfortunate Beryozkin gets captured. However, instead of calling the police, Sasha blackmails Beryozkin into helping her rob her own mother, because she wants her mother "to stop being a businesswoman and to become a mother again".

Things go as planned except that the banker's security are actually criminals, and plan to rob the banker themselves.

Cast 
 Aleksandr Zbruyev as Beryozkin, the unfortunate bank-robber 
 Vera Glagoleva as Sasha's Mother, the banker
 Yulia Chernova as Sasha
 Boris Sichkin as Aristarkh Rostopchin, the tramp that helps Beryozkin 
 Olga Volkova as Amalia Arkadyevna, Sasha's nanny
 Valery Garkalin as Kryshkin, one of the bank security/ robbers
 Spartak Mishulin as the mob boss that gives Beryozkin money
 Nina Ruslanova as Beryozkin's ex-wife
 Armen Dzhigarkhanyan as the prison warden
 Roman Madyanov as a prison guard
 Georgy Martirosyan as another prison guard

Awards 
 Kinotavr:  Best Actor — Aleksandr Zbruyev
 TEFI:  Best Feature Film
 IFF children's films Artek: Best actress-girl — Yulia Chernova

References

External links 
 

1990s adventure films
Films set around New Year
Russian crime films
Russian comedy films